Acrylophenone is an organic compound with the formula C9H8O. It is prepared using acetophenone, formaldehyde, and an amine hydrochloride in a Mannich reaction. It can be polymerized to poly(phenylvinyl ketone) via radical or anionic mechanisms. It is sometimes used as a comonomer in the manufacturing of certain resins.

References

Aromatic ketones
Monomers
Phenyl compounds
Enones